Korneuburg is a town in Austria. It is located in the state Lower Austria and is the administrative center of the district of Korneuburg. Korneuburg is situated on the left bank of the Danube, opposite the city of Klosterneuburg, and is 12 km northwest of Vienna. It covers an area of 9.71 square km and, there were 11,032 inhabitants.

Korneuburg was originally a bank settlement associated with Klosterneuburg under the name Nivenburg. It was first mentioned in 1136, and in 1298 received the right to formal separation from Klosterneuburg.

In 1938, the shipyard Korneuburg was integrated into the Hermann-Göring-Werke, and significantly enlarged. In 1941, 16 barracks for Germans, forced laborers and prisoners of war were added. In 1945, the Red Army captured the shipyard.

Military campaigns involving the city include the Battle of Vienna, the Thirty Years' War, the French Revolutionary Wars, and the Oil Campaign of World War II.

The Korneuburg Shipyard is now the site of a branch of the Museum of Military History, Vienna comprising two patrol boats, Niederösterreich and Oberst Brecht. These were the Austrian Army's last patrol ships on the Danube, and the successors of the KuK Kriegsmarine.

Population development
1900: 8,292
1939: 9,893
1971: 9,023
2012: 12,267

People 

 Johann Georg Lickl (1769–1843), Austrian composer
  (1827–1888), civil engineer
 Max Burckhard (1854–1912), director of the k.k. Hofburg Theater (Viennese Burgtheater)
 Nikolaus "Nico" (Josef Michael) Dostal (1895–1981), Austrian Operetta and film music composer
 Viktor Matejka (1901–1993), Austrian writer, politician
 Kurt Binder (1944-2022), Austrian physicist
 Helmuth Lehner (born 1968), singer and guitarist of the blackened death metal band Belphegor
 Mario Majstorović (born 1977), footballer

References

External links 

 
 KO2100 Korneuburg Community
 Website
 
 
 Revisiting the Transit Camp at Korneuburg after 58 Years

Cities and towns in Korneuburg District
Populated places on the Danube
Oil campaign of World War II